Jaripeo  refers to a form of bull riding practiced mainly in central and southern Mexico. It developed in the 16th century and originally involved riding fighting bulls to the death, but later evolved to where contestants attempt to ride bucking bulls until the animals tire and stops bucking. Jaripeos traditionally take place in lienzo charros (another word by which it can be known is toriles) or bull rings, but can also take place in modern arenas.

History 
The word Jaripeo derived from the Purépecha language in the Mexican state of Michoacán comes from Xarhipeo, the name of a village in said state. Dating back to 16th century Mexico, Jaripeo was originally a form of bull fighting in which the rider rode the bull to death. The Jaripeo later evolved to be seen as a test of courage rather than to just simply ride the bull to death. The modern objective of this event is to attempt to ride the bull until it becomes tame and stops bucking. At the present time, most of the occasions these events are organized are during the fiestas patronales, festivities that celebrate the religious entity that represents the town. Those in charge of creating the jaripeos are usually the local government helped by with ranchers from the region.

Traditions

Prayer 

At the start of a Jaripeo, oftentimes all of the participants and entertainers gather together while the announcer of the event recites a prayer called 'La Oracion del Jinete' which loosely translates to 'The Rider's Prayer'. This moment is the only time in which religion may be incorporated in the event and tends to be more common in Mexico than in the United States. This prayer is said to really clarify the line between life and death and serves as a reminder of how dangerous this event can be for the riders.

Las Reinas 
'Las Reinas del Jaripeo' or 'The queens' are the feminine side of a Jaripeo event. Traditionally, las reinas were typically a group of three to four young ladies who recently turned 15 years old. Being a reina implicated social recognition and served as a way to present these young girls into society almost like how they do in a Quinceañera. Las Reinas enter on horseback wearing long, colorful, traditional Mexican dresses, greeting the public while followed by about a dozen men on horseback. They do a circle around the arena before ultimately coming to a stop at the center where the Jinetes are then presented.

Jinetes 
Jinetes are the main event at Jaripeos. They wear leather Chaps and overall bright attire. Jinetes are people, usually men, who do bull or horseback riding. On some occasions the jinetes compete with each other. The format used to qualify each one and choose a winner consists of seeing how long the jinete lasts on top of the animal.

References

Rodeo in Mexico
Sport in Mexico
Sports originating in Mexico